Nubiothis is a genus of moths of the family Noctuidae. It is not widely accepted.

References
Natural History Museum Lepidoptera genus database

Heliothinae